Shiroda may refer to the following places in India:
 Shiroda, Goa, a village
 Shiroda (Maharashtra), a village